Pachamarathanalil is a 2008 Indian film produced by Revathy Kalamandir, written and directed by debutant Leo Thaddeus. It stars Sreenivasan and Padmapriya in the lead roles with Lalu Alex, Lal and Nassar in other pivotal roles.  The film's score and soundtrack is written by composer, Alphons Joseph.

Plot 
'Pachamarathanalil' tells the story of Sachidanandan alias Sachi. He is a well known cartoonist who is much popular as the creator of Thumpi, a very popular cartoon character in a children's magazine Sachi's wife Anu, a government employee is much obsessed with their 7-year-old daughter Sneha's studies. They lead a happy family life with Sneha, who is the cynosure of all eyes and attracts attention wherever she goes and inspires the creation of the cartoon character Thumpi.

The story begins to get hotter when an Advertisement film maker happens to notice Sneha and invites her to cast in his new advertisement film which is to be shot in Chennai. Sneha seems enjoying and easy going like a professional actress in the entire sets. After some days, the shoot is packed up for a shift to Pollachi. During the trip, Sachi gets shocked to find that Sneha is missing in the bus and he becomes frantic. He could not even imagine what will happen if Anu happens to know the news.

The drama at the highways takes a curious turn when CI Venkiti reaches the scene to investigate the case. Suddenly, a twist occurs which turns out that Sneha is not the daughter of Sachi. The film goes on to tell what happened to Sneha and who actually Sneha is. It was later revealed that Ali was the father of Sneha. Ali was unjustly accused and imprisoned for a bomb blast in Coimbatore and Sneha's mother died in childbirth and Sachi had found Sneha when Ali was caught by the police. Back in the present, Ali allows Sachi and Anu to look after Sneha since they've cared for her throughout her life as he is led to the back of the police van.

Cast
 Sreenivasan as Sachidanandan
 Padmapriya as Anu
 Nassar as C.I. Venkatachala Iyer 
 Lal as Mohammed Ali
 Lalu Alex as Alfie
 Suraj Venjaramoodu as Jose
 V. K. Sreeraman as Lohi
 Sukumari as Nun

Technicians 
The movie cinematographed by Manoj Pillai, will feature a couple of songs set to music by Alphons Joseph. Renjan Abraham does the editing while Joseph Nellikal handles the art direction. Majority of the movie was shot in and around Palakkad and Pollachi. This movie is produced by Sureshkumar in the banner of Revathy Kalamandhir.

External links 
 
 https://web.archive.org/web/20090602190442/http://popcorn.oneindia.in/title/539/pachamarathanalil.html

2008 films
2000s Malayalam-language films
Films scored by Alphons Joseph